Ariocarpus agavoides (known commonly as the  Tamaulipas living rock cactus) is a species of cactus. It is endemic to Mexico. It grows in dry shrubland in rocky calcareous substrates.

Description
This cactus is a small rosette-shaped succulent plant with short, stiff, dark green tubercles. The subglobose, flattened stem is greenish brown in color and up to 6 centimeters long by 8 centimeters in diameter. The rest of the plant is rootstock growing underground. The divergent, flaccid tubercles are flattened adaxially. The areoles at the tips of the tubercles are up to 1.2 centimeters long. Some individuals lack spines, while others have whitish spines up to a centimeter long.

Plants 5 to 8 years of age begin to grow magenta flowers up to 5 centimeters long. The pistils are a deep yellow and the stamens are white. The globose fruit is reddish in color and up to 2.2 centimeters long.

Habitat and distribution

A. agavoides has a narrow distribution in the rocky limestone hills at about 1200 meters in elevation in Tamaulipas and San Luis Potosí in Mexico.

Conservation actions
This cactus is listed as an endangered species by the International Union for Conservation of Nature and it is listed on CITES Appendix I. It is illegal to collect the cactus in Mexico as it is protected by the state under the national list of species at risk of extinction, NOM-059-SEMARNAT-2010. Despite the restriction, it still shows up in the trade market.

References

External links

agavoides
Cacti of Mexico
Endemic flora of Mexico
Flora of San Luis Potosí
Flora of Tamaulipas
Endangered plants
Endangered biota of Mexico
Taxonomy articles created by Polbot